Saengerfest Park is a small square park located on the corner of Tremont St (23rd St) and Strand St (Avenue B) in the Strand Historic District of Galveston, Texas.  The location includes a trolley stop, with a Yaga's Cafe and a Stuttgarden Tavern (formerly a Fuddrucker’s) nearby.

It was created in the early 1990s by George and Cynthia Mitchell. A relatively small urban park, Saengerfest is most known for having a large, playable chess set. The park also features a large compass which can be used as a seat, as well as other wooden benches, and old-fashioned London-style phone booths, which are red and relatively small.  A stage is available for bands to perform on, and vendors are allowed to set up tents in the park and sell trinkets.

Aftermath of Hurricane Rita (2005)

While Hurricane Rita struck the Texas-Louisiana border, a substantial amount of damage occurred in Galveston. Among the damage to Saengerfest, the 3-story wall of Yaga's Cafe (which is located west of the park) collapsed, blocking off the chess board for many months while the wall was being rebuilt.

References

Parks in Texas
Galveston, Texas